The Glass Chain or Crystal Chain sometimes known as the "Utopian Correspondence" was a chain letter that took place between November 1919 and December 1920. It was a correspondence of architects that formed a basis of expressionist architecture in Germany. It was initiated by Bruno Taut.

Names, pen-names, and locations of participants

Bibliography
Sharp, Dennis (1966). Modern Architecture and Expressionism. George Braziller: New York.
Whyte, Iain Boyd ed. (1985). Crystal Chain Letters: Architectural Fantasies by Bruno Taut and His Circle. The MIT Press.

External links
Gläserne Kette, Sammlung im Hans-Scharoun-Archiv (in German), Academy of Arts, Berlin
Die gläserne Kette collection, Canadian Centre for Architecture, Montreal, Quebec, Canada (digitized items)

Expressionist architecture
Architecture groups